Jem is a suburban mall in Jurong East, Singapore. The mall is directly connected to Jurong East MRT station and close to Jurong East Bus Interchange. It is also located adjacent to another mall called Westgate.

Overview
Jem is Singapore's third-largest suburban mall housing 241 shop units with over 818,000 square feet of retail space across six levels. Jem's name is an abbreviation of its original name, Jurong East Mall, and is a wordplay reference of the mall as the "crown jewel" of Jurong and western Singapore. 

The mall is directly connected to the Jurong East MRT interchange station and located at the junction of Jurong Gateway Road and Boon Lay Way. It is also connected to another mall named Westgate.

Major retailers include IKEA, FairPrice Xtra, Cathay Cineplexes, Cookhouse by Koufu, H&M, Uniqlo, Muji, Courts and Don Quijote (Don Don Donki).

History
Jem's official opening was initially planned to be on 11 June 2013. Due to initial tenancy issues, the opening of the mall was delayed. On 15 June 2013, Jem finally opened and attracted more than 10,000 shoppers at the time of the opening.

In 2019, JEM underwent minor renovations at Basement 1.

In August 2020, anchor tenant Robinsons was closed down and replaced by IKEA in 2021. The first small-store concept in Southeast Asia, this IKEA store will however not have a children's playground and built-in warehouse. The outlet opened on 29 April 2021 at 10am.

References

External links
 

2013 establishments in Singapore
Jurong East
Shopping malls established in 2013
Shopping malls in Singapore